Arablu Kandi (also Romanized as ‘Arablū Kandī) is a village in Savalan Rural District, in the Central District of Parsabad County, Ardabil Province, Iran. At the 2006 census, its population was 242, in 46 families.

References 

Towns and villages in Parsabad County